UTI Holdings is a large holding company in Romania structured in four divisions:

security and defence systems, 
information technology and communications, 
installations and constructions 
facility management.

External links
Official site

Holding companies of Romania
Privately held companies of Romania
Companies based in Bucharest